Mobicom Corporation is the largest mobile phone operator in Mongolia.

It was  established as a joint Mongolian-Japanese venture on 18 March 1996, to be the first Mongolian cell phone service. It was founded by Newcom Group, Sumitomo, and KDDI. Mongolia's Newcom. In 2016 March, Mobicom was consolidated in KDDI Corporation Group and KDDI took majority share.

As of June, 2015, Mobicom holds over 33 percent of the mobile service market, with network coverage of 95 percent across the country, the widest range of coverage in Mongolia. It delivers its services through 64 branch units, 2,200 dealers and over 10,000 mobile sales points.

Aside from cellular communications, Mobicom also has services including international communications, Internet and satellite communications and wireless local loop or WLL.  Its prepaid services are exclusively sold through Newtel LLC.

Mobicom introduced 3.5G networking in 2009, and provides HSPA.

Mobicom network support phones with UMTS 2100, HSDPA 2100, HSUPA 2100 or HSPA 2100 bands.

References

Telecommunications companies of Mongolia
Organizations based in Ulaanbaatar
Companies based in Ulaanbaatar